Jeremiah Dyson (1722 – 16 September 1776) was a British civil servant and politician.

Biography 
He studied at the University of Edinburgh and matriculated at Leiden University in 1742. He settled a pension on his friend Mark Akenside, the poet and physician, and later defended Akenside's The Pleasures of the Imagination against William Warburton. He was a friend of Samuel Richardson.

He purchased the clerkship of House of Commons in 1748, and became a Tory after George III's accession. He discontinued the practice of selling the clerkships subordinate to his office. He was Member of Parliament for Yarmouth, Isle of Wight 1762–8, for Weymouth and Melcombe Regis, 1768–74, and for Horsham, 1774. He was appointed a commissioner for the Board of Trade, 1764–8; a Lord of the Treasury, 1768–74;  and a Privy Counsellor in 1774.

He supported Lord North's treatment of the American colonies. Isaac Barré nicknamed him "Mungo" (the black slave in Isaac Bickerstaffe's The Padlock), for his noted attention to parliamentary business.

References

1722 births
1776 deaths
Alumni of the University of Edinburgh
Members of Parliament for the Isle of Wight
British MPs 1761–1768
British MPs 1768–1774
British MPs 1774–1780
Members of the Privy Council of Great Britain
Clerks of the House of Commons